Vernon John van Oudtshoorn (born 29 May 1976) is a former Zimbabwean cricketer. A right-handed batsman and right-arm fast-medium bowler, he played one first-class match for Mashonaland Country Districts during the 1995–96 Logan Cup. He also played two matches, one first-class match for Mashonaland XI and one List A match for Mashonaland Country Districts, against Tasmania in 1995.

References

External links
 
 

1976 births
Living people
Sportspeople from Bindura
Mashonaland cricketers
Zimbabwean cricketers